Poephila  is an Australian genus of estrildid finches.

The adults have pinkish underparts, buff or brown upperparts, a black tail and lower belly, and white rumps uppertail coverts and undertail coverts. Males and females closely resemble each other, although the male is a little larger.

These are birds of dry open grassland, occurring from the north-west to the eastern coast of Australia. They glean seed from the ground or seed-heads of grasses, occasionally supplementing their diet with insects.

Taxonomy 
The first description was presented to the Linnean Society by John Gould. and published in 1842. He assigned the species Poephila acuticauda as the type, a description he had published several years before as Amadina acuticauda, and gave a description for Poephila personata.

Species 
The genus is recognised as containing the following species:

References

 Clement, Harris and Davis, Finches and Sparrows  

 
Bird genera
Estrildidae
^